Markham Plateau is a small, but prominent, high plateau in Antarctica. The plateau was mapped by the United States Geological Survey from tellurometer surveys and U.S. Navy air photos, 1960–62, and was named by the Advisory Committee on Antarctic Names in association with Mount Markham.

See also
Mount Katsufrakis, a projecting-type mountain on the east side of Markham Plateau

References

External links

Plateaus of Antarctica
Landforms of the Ross Dependency
Shackleton Coast